The Abdul Rahman Mosque (Dari: مسجد عبدالرحمان), also known as the Grand Mosque of Kabul, is one of the largest mosques in Afghanistan. It is located in one of Kabul's central commercial areas called Deh Afghanan, near the Pashtunistan Square, Zarnegar Park, and across the once popular Plaza Hotel. One floor of the building is dedicated to women only.

The mosque is named after an influential Afghan businessman named Hajji Abdul Rahman who has died but his sons continued the project. Construction of the mosque began in 2001 by Hajji Abdur Rahman but was delayed for several years due to red tape. The mosque has the capacity to serve 10,000 people at a time. There is also a madrasa inside the mosque and a library containing 150,000 books.

The major work on the mosque was completed in late 2009 but the official inauguration took place in July 2012 which was attended by the former Afghan President Hamid Karzai and many other high-ranking officials. The building of the mosque is said to have been initially designed by Afghan architect Mir Hafizullah Hashimi.

See also
List of mosques in Afghanistan

References

2009 establishments in Afghanistan
Mosque buildings with domes
Mosques completed in 2009
Mosques in Kabul
Sunni mosques in Afghanistan